Ctenucha bruneri is a moth of the family Erebidae. It is found on Cuba.

References

bruneri
Moths described in 1938
Endemic fauna of Cuba